"Another You" is a song written by Brad Paisley before his own solo career started, and recorded by American country music artist David Kersh.  It was released in January 1997 as the third single from his debut studio album Goodnight Sweetheart.  The song reached #3 on the Billboard Hot Country Singles & Tracks chart and #14 on the Canadian RPM Country Tracks chart.

Chart performance
"Another You" debuted at number 65 on the U.S. Billboard Hot Country Singles & Tracks for the week of January 18, 1997.

Year-end charts

References

1997 singles
David Kersh songs
Songs written by Brad Paisley
Curb Records singles
1996 songs